HMS Trenchant was a modified Admiralty  destroyer which served with the Royal Navy. The vessel was the first of the modified design. Launched in 1916, the ship operated with the Grand Fleet during the First World War. The vessel was involved in escorting convoys and attacking German submarines. After the war, Trenchant was attacked by Republican forces during the Irish War of Independence but suffered little damage. The vessel was retired and sold to be broken up on 15 November 1928. The subsequent  are sometimes called Modified Trenchant class.

Design and development
Trenchant was one of ten Modified  destroyers ordered by the British Admiralty in March 1916 as part of the Eighth War Construction Programme. The vessel was the first of the new design, which differed from the previous R class in being larger, although they retained the same armament. The related  which followed are sometimes called the Modified Trenchant class.

Two funnels were fitted, two boilers exhausting through the forward funnel.

Armament consisted of three QF 4in Mk IV guns on the ship's centreline, with one on the forecastle, one on a raised platform aft and one between the funnels. A single 2-pounder (40 mm) pom-pom anti-aircraft gun was carried, while torpedo armament consisted of two twin rotating mounts for  torpedoes. The ship had a complement of 82 officers and ratings.

Construction and career
Trenchant was laid down by J. Samuel White at East Cowes on the Isle of Wight with the yard number 1481, and launched on 28 June the following year. The vessel was the first of the name, recalling the species of Marten, and was launched on 23 December 1916.

On commissioning, Trenchant joined the 15th Destroyer Flotilla of the Grand Fleet, and served there until 1919. The vessel was used for anti-submarine patrols. On 15 June 1917, the destroyer unsuccessfully attacked a German U-boat with a depth charge. A related role was of convoy escort. For example, on 14 August, Trenchant formed part of the escort for convoy HH13, which arrived without losing a ship. Occasionally, action involved working with larger fleets. For example, on 16 October, the destroyer accompanied the 2nd Light Cruiser Squadron to search for German minelayers. No minelayers were found.

The vessel was reduced to reduced complement on 15 February 1919. While undergoing a refit in Haulbowline on 3 June 1921, Trenchant was attacked by Republican forces during the Irish War of Independence but suffered little damage. The destroyer was retired sold to be broken up on 15 November 1928.

Pennant numbers

References

Bibliography

Bibliography

 
 
 
 
 
 
 
 
 

1916 ships
R-class destroyers (1916)
Ships built on the Isle of Wight
World War I destroyers of the United Kingdom